Tehla is a village and municipality in the Levice District in the Nitra Region of Slovakia.

History
In historical records the village was first mentioned in 1251.

Geography
The village lies at an altitude of 172 metres and covers an area of 19.093 km². It has a population of about 554 people.

Ethnicity
The village is about 75% Slovak, 22% Magyar and 3% Gypsy.

Facilities
The village has a public library and football pitch.

External links
http://www.statistics.sk/mosmis/eng/run.html

Villages and municipalities in Levice District